Karel Hasil (born 13 July 1998) is a Czech footballer who played as a centre back or full-back for Bohemian Football League side Sokol Brozany.

Career

Teplice
Born in Louny, Hasil started his career at local club FK SEKO Louny at the age of six, before later moving to FK Teplice at the age of 14. Hasil went through all youth categories in Teplice and was promoted to the club B-team in 2017.

Loan spells
To get some experience, Hasil was loaned out to Czech National Football League club FC MAS Táborsko for the 2018-19 season. During the season, he made 20 appearances and scored three goals.

On 29 January 2020, six months after returning from the first loan spell, Hasil was loaned out again, this time to Baník Sokolov, also in the National Football League. At Baník Sokolov, he made 13 appearances and scored two goals. On 21 August 2020, Hasil was loaned out for the third time, to FK Varnsdorf for the 2020-21 season.

Return to Teplice
Hasil returned to Teplice in the summer 2021 and was registered for the first team squad. He got his official debut for the club on 30 July 2021 against Slavia Prague. Hasil started on the bench, before replacing Alois Hyčka in the 86th minute.

Later career
In July 2022, Hasil joined Bohemian Football League side Sokol Brozany on a free transfer.

References

External links
 
 Karel Hasil at FAČR
 

1998 births
Living people
Association football defenders
Czech footballers
Czech Republic youth international footballers
People from Louny
Czech National Football League players
Czech First League players
FK Teplice players
FC Silon Táborsko players
FK Baník Sokolov players
FK Varnsdorf players
Sportspeople from the Ústí nad Labem Region